The 2020–21 Los Angeles Kings season was the 54th season (53rd season of play) for the National Hockey League franchise that was established on June 5, 1967. On December 20, 2020, the league temporarily realigned into four divisions with no conferences due to the COVID-19 pandemic and the ongoing closure of the Canada-United States border. As a result of this realignment, the Kings played this season in the West Division and only played games against the other teams in their new division during the regular season.

On May 7, 2021, the Kings were eliminated from playoff contention after a 3–2 loss to the Colorado Avalanche, failing to make the playoffs for a third consecutive season.

Standings

Divisional standings

Schedule and results

Regular season
The regular season schedule was published on December 23, 2020.

Transactions
The Kings have been involved in the following transactions during the 2020–21 season.

Free agents
Note: This does not include players who have re-signed with their previous team as an unrestricted free agent or as a restricted free agent.

Trades
* Retained Salary Transaction: Each team is allowed up to three contracts on their payroll where they have retained salary in a trade (i.e. the player no longer plays with Team A due to a trade to Team B, but Team A still retains some salary). Only up to 50% of a player's contract can be kept, and only up to 15% of a team's salary cap can be taken up by retained salary. A contract can only be involved in one of these trades twice.

Hover over-retained salary or conditional transactions for more information.

October

March

April

Draft picks

Below are the Los Angeles Kings' selections at the 2020 NHL Entry Draft, which was originally scheduled for June 26–27, 2020 at the Bell Center in Montreal, Quebec, but was postponed on March 25, 2020, due to the COVID-19 pandemic. It was held October 6–7, 2020 virtually via Video conference call from the NHL Network studio in Secaucus, New Jersey.

References

 

Los Angeles Kings seasons
Los Angeles Kings
Kings
Kings
Los Angeles Kings
Los Angeles Kings